Gjorgji is a Macedonian given name and may refer to:

Gjorgji Abadžiev (1910–1963), Macedonian prosaist and publicist
Gjorgji Čekovski (born 1979), Macedonian professional basketball player
Gjorgji Hristov (born 1976), Macedonian football coach and former striker
Gjorgji Ivanov (born 1960), the President of the Republic of Macedonia, in office in 2009–2019
Gjorgji Jovanovski (born 1956), Macedonian football manager and former player
Gjorgji Knjazev (born 1971), former Macedonian professional basketball Shooting guard
Gjorgji Kolozov (1948–2003), one of the best-known Macedonian actors
Gjorgji Markovski (born 1986), alpine skier who competed for Macedonia at the 2006 Winter Olympics
Gjorgji Mojsov (born 1985), Macedonian footballer
Gjorgji Pulevski (1817–1895), writer and revolutionary from Galičnik, today in the Republic of Macedonia
Gjorgji Talevski (born 1976), former Macedonian professional basketball Power forward
Gjorgji Tanušev (born 1991), Macedonian football midfielder playing in Serbian First League club Kolubara

See also
Gjorgji Kyçyku Stadium, a stadium in Pogradec, Albania
Gorgi (disambiguation)
Gorji (disambiguation)
Jorg (disambiguation)